Maccabi Haifa Football Club is one of the four most successful Israeli clubs in European competition. Maccabi Haifa was the first Israeli to qualify for the Champions League Group stage and the first to do so twice and three times. Maccabi Haifa also qualify to Quarter-finals of European Cup Winners' Cup, to Round of 16 in UEFA cup, three times to Group stage of UEFA Europa League, and to the Group stage of the UEFA Conference League once. in the Second qualifying round of Europa League won 8–0 vs Khazar Lankaran a new win record of any Israeli team in European competition.

Over the years Haifa Opponent against big teams in continent same Paris Saint-Germain, Manchester United, Liverpool, Bayern Munich or Juventus.

Achievements in Europe

Matches

Before joining UEFA

After joining UEFA

Maccabi Haifa in European group stages

Champions League

2002–03 Group F

2009–10 Group A

2022–23 Group H

Europa League

2011–12 Group J

2013–14 Group L

Europa Conference League

2021–22 Group E

UEFA Cup

2006–07 Group A

Maccabi Haifa in European knockout phases

UEFA Cup — 2006–07

Maccabi Haifa won 1–0 on aggregate.

Espanyol won 4–0 on aggregate.

Statistics

By competition

Before joining UEFA

Statistics by country

Scorers

UCL = UEFA Champions League
UEL = UEFA Europa League (Included UEFA CUP)
UECL = UEFA Europa Conference League
UCWC = UEFA Cup Winners' Cup
UIC =  UEFA Intertoto Cup
 In bold Wrote players still part from the club .

UEFA Team Ranking

 Bold row separators indicate change of ranking system.
 Italic font indicate ongoing season.

Notes

References

Maccabi Haifa F.C.
Israeli football clubs in international competitions